Cycle routes in London that have been waymarked with formal route signage include "Cycleways" (including "Cycle Superhighways" and "Quietways") and the older London Cycle Network, all designated by the local government body Transport for London (TfL), National Cycle Network routes designated by the sustainable transport charity Sustrans, and miscellaneous "Greenways" created by various bodies. Most recently, in May 2020 TfL announced its "Streetspace for London" in response to the COVID-19 pandemic. Not all these routes are dedicated 'traffic free' cycle tracks: most of them also include ordinary roads shared with motor traffic and footpaths shared with pedestrians.

Cycleways

From summer 2019, TfL started branding new cycle routes (and re-branding and consolidating some existing routes) as 'Cycleways'. This was following feedback and criticism that the previous branding ('Superhighways' and 'Quietways') was sometimes "misleading".

In addition, all new and existing routes will have to meet newer and stricter 'Cycling Quality Criteria' in order to get signed as Cycleways by TfL.

Central London Cycle Grid 
A partially completed scheme within the central London area which includes both numbered and unnumbered Cycleways, Cycle Superhighways and Quietways.

Cycle Superhighways 

London's Cycle Superhighways were a set of Bike freeways, that were aimed principally at commuters and more experienced cyclists, providing faster and more direct radial routes between outer and central London.
In addition to route signage with a pink logo, other distinctive features included blue cycle lanes on some of the routes (the brand colour of the scheme's original sponsor, Barclays) and 'totem' style signage pillars.

History
London's Cycle Superhighways were first announced in 2008 by Mayor Ken Livingstone. The original proposal consisted of 12 radial routes, with routes numbered in 'clock face' fashion. However, several of these proposed routes were never built, due to opposition from the respective London boroughs. Initial implementation of the cycle superhighways also drew criticism on safety grounds, with poor design at some junctions, insufficient segregation of cyclists from motor traffic and slippery surfaces all contributing to numerous fatalities.

In 2018 TfL dropped the 'cycle superhighway' name from use on any further projects. All the existing Cycle Superhighways are now part of the Cycleways network and will be rebranded as a numbered 'Cycleway'.

Quietways

First announced in 2015, TfL's Quietways targeted less confident cyclists who want to use routes with less traffic, whilst also providing for existing cyclists who want to travel at a more gentle pace. The route numbers were shown in purple on signs.

The scheme lasted only three years before TfL decided to drop the Quietways brand, using 'Cycleways' for further new routes. All Quietways are now formally part of the Cycleways network and the delivered Quietways are being gradually rebranded as 'Cycleways' (and renumbered in most cases).

Streetspace for London
In May 2020, in response to the COVID-19 pandemic and the resulting need to maintain social distancing, TfL announced a programme of measures that includes additional cycling provision. Some of these measures are described as 'temporary', although others appear to include fast-tracking of permanent cycle routes. TfL implemented routes delivered under this programme have so far included: 

Additionally, numerous pop up cycle routes have been funded by TfL or the Department for Transport as part of Streetspace, but implemented by boroughs. Funding has also been provided for Low Traffic Neighbourhoods, which have filtered roads to prevent through traffic through residential areas, having a knock on effect on cycling by improving links through these areas. As of January 2021, TfL's website listed over 30 different Streetspace schemes. Sustrans published a map of streetspace interventions.

London Cycle Network Plus 

The London Cycle Network Plus (LCN+) aimed to provide a 900 kilometre network of cycle routes throughout Greater London. It was funded by Transport for London and managed by the LCN+ Project Team at the London Borough of Camden. It was launched in 2001, replacing the earlier London Cycle Network (LCN) project (which had begun rollout in 1981, originally planning 3000 miles of signposted routes), and wound up in 2010.

Although some LCN routes have been upgraded to TfL's new Quietways and Cycle Superhighways, the majority throughout Greater London still exist and are signposted and/or indicated by carriageway markings (although not all the signage uses route numbers). Where route numbers are used in signs, this is usually the LCN route number, but on some route sections the 'LCN+ link' number has been used on signs. (LCN+ link numbers were usually internal reference numbers used for project management.)

London Cycle Network routes 
The LCN route numbering used a radial and orbital scheme, as shown by the groupings in the table below. Some routes were also part of the Sustrans National Cycle Network – these are signposted with route numbers on a red background. There were also a comparable number of un-numbered routes in the scheme. These are not listed in the table below. 

The last edition of the LCN route map to be published was the 5th edition (2004).

National and international routes

National Cycle Network routes 

The sustainable transport charity Sustrans describe their National Cycle Network (NCN) as "a network of safe traffic-free paths and quiet on-road cycling" that "criss-cross the country, linking up villages, towns and cities". Eleven of these pass through London. NCN routes are signed with white lettering on a blue background, save for the route number, set on a small red rectangle. In July 2020 Sustrans de-designated nearly a quarter of its National Cycle Network on safety grounds, including some in London.

International Cycle Network routes 
Per the notes column above, two sections are co-opted by the European Cyclists' Federation as forming part of their international EuroVelo network, which is largely aimed at promoting cycling tourism in Europe:
 EV2 The Capitals Route, which runs from Galway in Ireland to Moscow in Russia, follows the course of  along the River Thames from west London to Greenwich, and then follows  northwards towards Colchester,

Neither EV2 nor EV12 are signed as EuroVelo routes, so cyclists would instead need to rely on the relevant national route (NCN) signage.

Additionally the Avenue Verte international route from London to Paris begins in central London, largely following Sustrans route NCN20 within the Greater London area.

Greenways
London's "Greenways" are a loosely defined collection of mostly traffic-free shared cycling and walking routes, predominantly within (or connecting to) various parks and open spaces within Greater London. TfL and Sustrans claimed that "Greenways should be suitable for use by a novice adult cyclist, a family with young children or a sensible, unaccompanied 12-year-old". 

Greenways in London have been developed by numerous different bodies, including Sustrans (who began the Greenways initiative in 1994), Transport for London, the Canal and River Trust, the London Boroughs, the Royal Parks, the Lee Valley Regional Park Authority and the 2012 Olympic Delivery Authority, under various different funding programmes (including the 2009–2014 London Greenways scheme, the 2012 Games Walking and Cycling Routes programme, 'Connect2', the National Cycle Network, and others). 

The routes tend to have names rather than numbers, and many of them use waymarking signs or markers in the carriageway, but there is no consistent scheme covering all of them. Some of the Greenways have been co-opted into the other TfL or Sustrans schemes listed earlier in this article. 

The table below lists the most notable Greenways in London. 

‡ These routes were developed for the 2012 Summer Olympic Games

See also 
 Cycling in London
 Santander Cycles
 National Cycle Network
 Cycleways in England
 List of cycleways
 London greenways
 Segregated cycle facilities

References

External links 
 Transport for London (TfL)
 Transport for London's Cycle map
 National Cycle Network map
 Best (National Cycle Network) routes in London (Sustrans)
 Where Are London's Cycle Superhighways? (YouTube video from Londonist Ltd)
 Detailed map and video of full Quietway 1 route
 London Cycle network +
 Greenways Report

 
London transport-related lists